The Wooster Oilers are a junior ice hockey team and member of the United States Premier Hockey League 'Premier' level. The Oilers play home games at the Alice Noble Ice Arena in Wooster, Ohio.

History
The franchise started in 2006 as an expansion team in the America East Hockey League (AEHL). After the 2007–08 season the team moved to the United Junior Hockey League (UJHL) for the 2008–09 season along with two other AEHL teams. The Wooster Oilers finished third overall in their first season in the UJHL.

The following season after the UJHL collapsed, the Wooster Oilers, along with many other UJHL franchises, joined the Northern Junior Hockey League. After the 2009–10 season, the Oilers announced they would join the Tier III Great Lakes Junior Hockey League.

The 2012–13 season brought changes again as the Oilers joined the USA Hockey-sanctioned Tier III Minnesota Junior Hockey League (MnJHL). The Oilers finished fifth overall in their inaugural season and made it to the semifinals in playoffs.  

On December 18, 2014, the United States Premier Hockey League announced that it was adding the Central Division of the MnJHL teams to their new Midwest Division including the Oilers. However, on February 12, 2015, the North American 3 Hockey League announced that its board of governors had approved the sale and relocation of the Cleveland Jr. Lumberjacks membership to owners of the Oilers for the 2015–16 season, allowing the Oilers to join the NA3HL. Originally the owners had planned to play two Tier III teams for the 2015–16 season, but by June it was reported that they had dropped their plans for the USPHL team and would only play in the NA3HL.

However, after three seasons in the NA3HL, the Oilers left the league for the USPHL's Premier Division, now a non-sanctioned league, for the 2018–19 season. After a one-season hiatus due to the uncertainty of their home arena possibly closing, the Wooster Oilers returned to the USPHL for the 2020–21 season.

Season-by season records

References

External links
Official site

Junior ice hockey teams in the United States
Ice hockey clubs established in 2006
Ice hockey teams in Ohio
2006 establishments in Ohio
Wayne County, Ohio